A ghost ship is a vessel with no living crew aboard.

Ghost Ship may also refer to:

Film and television 
 The Ghost Ship, a 1943 film
 Ghost Ship (1952 film), a British thriller
 Ghost Ship (2002 film), an American supernatural horror film
 "The Ghost Ship" (Stingray), a 1964 television episode
 "Ghost Ship", an episode of MacGyver (1985 TV series, season 3)
 "Ghost Ship", an episode of Quantum Leap (season 4)

Literature 
 Ghost Ship (Cussler novel), 2014
 Ghost Ship (novella), a 2002 Doctor Who novella by Keith Topping
 Ghost Ship, a 1988 Star Trek: The Next Generation novel by Diane Carey
 The Ghost Ship, a 1990 book of poetry by Henry Hart
 "The Ghost Ship", a 1912 short story by Richard Barham Middleton
 Ghost Ship, a 2011 science fiction novel by Sharon Lee and Steve Miller

Music 
 Ghost Ship (album), by Sultans, 2000
 Ghost Ships (album), by James Reyne, 2007
 Ghost Ship (Theocracy album), 2016
 Ghostship EP, by The Fall of Troy, 2004
 Ghost Ship (band), a contemporary worship music band from Seattle
 "Ghost Ship", a song by Blur from the 2015 album The Magic Whip
 "Ghost Ship", a song by Nox Arcana from the 2008 Phantoms of the High Seas
 "Ghost Ship", a song by Robyn Hitchcock from the 1995 album You & Oblivion 
 "Ghost Ship", a 2011 song by Neverending White Lights 
 "Ghostship", a song by Shadow Gallery from the 2009 album Carved in Stone

Other uses
 Ghost Ship (beer), by Adnams brewery
 Ghost Ship, an imprint of Seven Seas Entertainment
 Ghost Ship (sculpture), a 2001 sculpture in Portland, Oregon, U.S.
 Ghost Ship warehouse fire, Oakland, California, U.S., in 2016
 Juliet Marine Systems Ghost, an advanced super-cavitating stealth ship

See also 

 Ghost boat (disambiguation)
 Death Ship (disambiguation)
 Phantom Ship (disambiguation)